Foxboro Stadium, originally Schaefer Stadium and later Sullivan Stadium, was an outdoor stadium in the New England region of the United States, located in Foxborough, Massachusetts. It opened in 1971 and served as the home of the New England Patriots of the National Football League (NFL) for 31 seasons (through January 2002) and also as the home venue for the New England Revolution of Major League Soccer (MLS) from 1996 to 2002. The stadium was the site of several games in both the 1994 FIFA World Cup and the 1999 FIFA Women's World Cup. Foxboro Stadium was demolished in 2002 and replaced by Gillette Stadium and the Patriot Place shopping center.

History
The stadium opened in August 1971 as Schaefer  primarily as the home venue for the renamed New England Patriots of the National Football League. The team was known as the Boston Patriots for its first eleven seasons 1960–70, and had played in various stadiums in the Boston area. For six seasons, 1963–68, the Patriots played in Fenway Park, home of baseball's Boston Red Sox. Like most baseball stadiums, Fenway was poorly suited as a football venue. Its seating capacity was inadequate—only about 40,000 for football—and many seats had obstructed views. Indeed, before the Patriots arrived, numerous previous attempts at pro football in Boston had been stymied by the lack of a pro-caliber stadium. (The Redskins left after the 1936 season, in which they hosted the NFL Championship Game, not in Boston but at the Polo Grounds in New York City.)

The Boston Patriots played the 1969 season at Alumni Stadium at Boston College in Chestnut Hill, Massachusetts, and the 1970 season, their first in the NFL, at Harvard Stadium in Boston's Allston neighborhood.

The site was selected when the owners of Bay State Raceway donated the land, midway between Boston and Providence, Rhode Island. The general contractor who built the stadium was a Massachusetts-based company named J.F White Contracting Co.

Ground was broken in September 1970, and it cost $7.1 million, only $200,000 over budget.  Even allowing for this modest cost overrun, it was still a bargain price for a major sports stadium even by 1970s standards. This was because the Patriots received no funding from the Commonwealth of Massachusetts or the town of Foxborough; indeed, it was one of the few major league stadiums of that era that was entirely privately funded.

Seating capacity

Playing surface
Like the majority of outdoor sports venues built in North America in the 1970s, Foxboro Stadium was designed for the use of an artificial turf playing surface. The original field was Poly-Turf, succeeded by AstroTurf. A natural grass field was installed before the start of the 1991 season.

Naming rights
The original name in 1971 was Schaefer Stadium for the brewery of that name in an early example of the sale of naming rights. When this agreement expired after the 1982 season, Anheuser-Busch took over the rights. Instead of putting the name of one of its brands of beer on the stadium, Anheuser-Busch agreed to name it in honor of the Sullivan family, then the majority owners of the Patriots. The name Sullivan Stadium took effect on May 23, 1983. After Sullivan went bankrupt and Robert Kraft purchased the stadium, Kraft stripped Sullivan's name and renamed the venue "Foxboro Stadium". Although the official spelling of the town's name is "Foxborough", the shorter spelling was used for the stadium.

During the ownership of Victor Kiam, ESPN anchor Chris Berman humorously referred to the facility as "Shaver Stadium", a pun on Kiam's fame from Remington razor commercials and the stadium's original name.

Notable events

Soccer
The venue hosted numerous significant soccer matches, including six games in the 1994 FIFA World Cup. Foxboro Stadium was the last stadium where Diego Maradona scored a World Cup goal in a game against Greece, and where he last played in an official FIFA World Cup match against Nigeria on June 25, 1994.

The stadium hosted five games in the 1999 FIFA Women's World Cup, the 1996 and 1999 MLS Cups, and the inaugural Women's United Soccer Association Founders Cup.

1994 FIFA World Cup

1999 FIFA Women's World Cup

Major League Soccer finals

Women's United Soccer Association finals

College Football

Holy Cross Crusaders 
During the final week of the 1971 season, Holy Cross moved its home game against rival Boston College to the newly-constructed Schaefer Stadium, due to a heavy snowstorm that rendered Fitton Field in Worcester unplayable.

Boston College Eagles 
In the opening week of the 1975 season, Boston College hosted Notre Dame at Schaefer Stadium in their first ever meeting.  From 1983 through 1987, BC used Schaefer/Sullivan Stadium as an alternate home venue to host crowds larger than could be accommodated on campus at Alumni Stadium.

Other events
The stadium hosted numerous other outdoor events, primarily concerts, along with music festivals, including The Monsters of Rock Festival Tour and The Vans Warped Tour, as well as the WWF King of the Ring tournament on July 8, 1985 and July 14, 1986.
U2 played on The Joshua Tree Tour on September 22, 1987, and later performed three nights of their Zoo TV Tour on August 20, 22, and 23, 1992.
Schaefer Stadium hosted Elton John on July 4, 1976, as well as Boz Scaggs, The Eagles, and Fleetwood Mac on July 25, 1976.

Sullivan Stadium hosted The Who's 25th anniversary tour on July 12 and 14, 1989.

Paul McCartney brought the Flowers In the Dirt Tour to the stadium on July 24 and 26, 1990.

New Kids on The Block brought The Magic Summer Tour to the stadium on July 29 and July 31, 1990. An audience of 53,000 people attended one of two concert dates.

Genesis brought the We Can't Dance Tour to the stadium on May 28, 1992.

Metallica and Guns N' Roses brought the Guns N' Roses/Metallica Stadium Tour to the stadium on September 11, 1992, with Faith No More as their opening act.

Elton John performed at the venue in front of 62,000 on US Bicentennial on July 4, 1976. John again appeared in a Face to Face concert with Billy Joel on July 18, 1994.

Madonna performed her "Who's That Girl" tour there on July 9, 1987, to a sell-out crowd. Bob Dylan and the Grateful Dead recorded a portion of their collaborative live album, entitled Dylan & the Dead, there on July 4, 1987. Pink Floyd played a two-night stand in May 1988 (on one of the nights their inflatable pig was torn to shreds). They also played a three-night sold-out stand in May 1994 on their The Division Bell Tour which was recorded and readily available on bootleg. (The second night was filmed by MTV for promotional purposes.) The Dave Matthews Band played seven shows at the stadium from 1998 to 2001.

The Rolling Stones played three nights on September 27 and 29 and October 1, 1989, then two more nights on September 4 and 5, 1994 and lastly October 20 and 21, 1997.

Additionally, in 1994, the Drum Corps International World Championships were held in the stadium.

Closing
By the late 1990s, Foxboro Stadium had become functionally obsolete by modern NFL standards. Despite excellent sight lines to view game action or concerts and having fewer of the issues that multi-sport multi-purpose stadiums in other cities had, the stadium was otherwise outmoded. The facility was built in a low-cost "bare bones" manner with unexceptional architectural elements, and had very few modern amenities. The stadium's plumbing was not designed with NFL-sized crowds in mind, which became evident when a sewage issue overflowed the restroom facilities during its first game. Stadium officials were forced to augment the permanent toilets with rented portable toilets for the rest of the stadium's existence. It also lacked luxury boxes, an increasingly important source of revenue for other teams in the league. Most patrons had to sit on backless aluminum benches (or like still done in the lower Lambeau Field bowl today, rent or bring in their own stadium cushions and portable chairbacks, especially in cold weather), as only a small fraction of the seats had permanent chairbacks (painted blue, red and white near the 50-yard line).  During heavy rains, the numerous unpaved spots in the parking lot turned to mud.  It frequently took an hour or more to leave after games, due to its location on a then-undivided four-lane portion of U.S. Route 1. In order to host the FIFA World Cup (and later, the New England Revolution), several rows of seats were removed to accommodate a soccer pitch with acceptable dimensions to FIFA.

With a capacity of just over 60,000 (only 10,000 above the NFL's minimum seating capacity), it was one of the smallest stadiums in the NFL. It was also almost completely exposed to the elements, meaning that there was almost no protection for the fans in storms (outside of beneath the stands) or in extreme cold. Additionally, the Sullivan family had lost millions promoting the Jackson Victory Tour in 1984. Due to their relatively modest wealth compared to other NFL owners, they pledged the stadium as collateral for the tour. Knowing that the revenue from the Patriots would not be nearly enough to service the debt, the Sullivans quietly put the team and the stadium on the market. The Sullivans' financial picture was so dire that even when the Patriots made Super Bowl XX, the team didn't bring in nearly enough money to service the debt from the Victory Tour. With most of their money tied up in the team, they sold controlling interest in the Patriots to Victor Kiam in 1989. The stadium, however, lapsed into bankruptcy and was bought by paper magnate Robert Kraft.

When Kiam and Sullivan tried to sell the team to interests in Jacksonville, Kraft effectively stymied the deal by refusing to let the team out of their lease, which contained an ironclad commitment to play in the stadium until 2001.  As a result, when Kiam himself was crippled by financial troubles, he sold the Patriots to James Orthwein in 1992. After only two years, Orthwein tried to move the Patriots to his hometown of St. Louis. However, as in 1992, Kraft refused to let the Patriots out of their lease. Orthwein then put the team on the market, but the wording of the operating covenant required any potential buyer to negotiate with Kraft.  With this in mind, Kraft swooped in and bought the team himself. Two years later, Kraft bought the parcel of land containing neighboring Bay State Raceway, allowing him to build a new and privately-financed stadium on the raceway property after proposals to build a new stadium in Hartford, Connecticut and South Boston failed.

After 31 NFL seasons, Foxboro Stadium was scheduled to be demolished on December 23, 2001, the day after the Patriots' final home game. However, the stadium would instead play host to the first season of the Tom Brady and Bill Belichick era, with the team making a run to get into the playoffs and going on to win their first Super Bowl. As a result, the stadium was not demolished until late January 2002, after the conclusion of the 2001 postseason. The last game played in the stadium, "The Tuck Rule Game", was played in a snow storm; a Patriots win against the Oakland Raiders, which famously featured an overturned fumble call based on the then-applicable tuck rule in the final minutes. The stadium's former site became parking lots for its successor, Gillette Stadium, before being developed into the open-air shopping center Patriot Place.

References

1971 establishments in Massachusetts
1994 FIFA World Cup stadiums
2002 disestablishments in Massachusetts
American football venues in Massachusetts
Boston College Eagles football venues
Boston Minutemen
Buildings and structures in Foxborough, Massachusetts
Defunct college football venues
Former Major League Soccer stadiums
Defunct National Football League venues
Defunct soccer venues in Massachusetts
Demolished sports venues in Massachusetts
1999 FIFA Women's World Cup stadiums
Sports in Foxborough, Massachusetts
New England Patriots stadiums
New England Revolution
North American Soccer League (1968–1984) stadiums
Soccer venues in Massachusetts
Sports venues completed in 1971
Sports venues demolished in 2002